The 1999 Military World Games was the second edition of the global multi-sport event for military personnel, organised by the International Military Sports Council (CISM). It was hosted in Zagreb, Croatia from 8 to 17 August.

Mar del Plata, Argentina, was the original choice of host, but withdrew due to organisational problems. The opening ceremony was held at the Stadion Maksimir, which also served as a venue for the association football matches. Russia easily topped the medal table with 46 golds among its 112 medals. China was the next most successful with 29 golds in its haul of 66 medals, while Italy ranked third with sixteen gold medals. The hosts Croatia performed well given their comparative size, finishing fourth with eleven gold medals.

A total of twenty-two sports were contested at the competition. An increase of five from the previous edition in 1995. Four swimming world records were broken during the competition: Lorenzo Vismara  set records in the 50-metre and 100-metre freestyle swimming events, while his compatriot Emiliano Brembilla also broke freestyle records over the 400-metre and 1500-metre distances.

Sports

 (demonstration)

 (demonstration)

Venues

Medal table

References

Sport, nation and venue information
Bell, Daniel (2003). Encyclopedia of International Games. McFarland and Company, Inc. Publishers, Jefferson, North Carolina. .

External links
CISM website

 
Military World Games
Military World Games
Military World Games
International sports competitions hosted by Croatia
Military World Games, 1999
Military World Games, 1999
Military World Games
Military World Games, 1999